Metentoria is a genus of stick insects in the tribe Clitumnini, erected by Carl Brunner von Wattenwyl in 1907.  Species have been recorded from: India and Vietnam (possibly an incomplete distribution).

Species
The Phasmida Species File lists:
 Metentoria regina Brunner von Wattenwyl, 1907 - type species
 Metentoria regulus (Westwood, 1859)

References

External links

Phasmatodea genera
Phasmatodea of Asia
Phasmatidae